The Canadian Open Chess Championship is Canada's Open chess championship, first held in 1956, and held annually since 1973, usually in mid-summer. It is organized by the Chess Federation of Canada. The event celebrated its 50th rendition in 2013.

History
It was organized every two years from 1956 until 1970. The tournament rotates around the country, and has been held in eight of Canada's ten provinces during its 63-year history, missing only Nova Scotia and Prince Edward Island. The format has usually been a Swiss system with nine or ten rounds, usually over a nine-day period. It is open to all players who wish to enter, from Grandmasters to beginners.

The Championship's list of winners has included some of the world's strongest players, including Grandmasters Boris Spassky (in 1971, while he was World chess champion), Bent Larsen, Alexei Shirov, Vassily Ivanchuk, Viktor Bologan, Artur Yusupov, Bu Xiangzhi, Alexander Moiseenko, Kevin Spraggett, Ljubomir Ljubojević, Larry Evans, Pal Benko, William Lombardy, Gyula Sax, Igor Vasilyevich Ivanov, Walter Browne, Tony Miles, Larry Christiansen, Joel Benjamin, Eduardas Rozentalis, Vladimir Tukmakov, Jonathan Rowson, Luke McShane, Vladimir Epishin, Vladimir Malaniuk, Pentala Harikrishna, Alexander Shabalov, Nigel Short, Eric Hansen, and many other top stars.

The first tournament in Montreal 1956 was noteworthy for the presence of 13-year-old Bobby Fischer, a future World chess champion, who tied for 8-12th places. Montreal 1974 saw the largest attendance to date, with 648 players. Ottawa 2007 set a tournament record with 22 Grandmasters participating. Canadian Grandmaster Kevin Spraggett has the record for most titles with eight (either clear first or shared). Laszlo Witt made a perfect score (9-0) at Ottawa 1962; this was matched by Alexander Cherniev at Regina 2019. Mark Bluvshtein is the youngest champion, at age 17 at Edmonton in 2005. Daniel Yanofsky was the oldest champion, at age 54, also in Edmonton in 1979. Toronto has hosted the most Opens with ten, followed by Ottawa with seven and Edmonton with six.

The 2014 edition was held in Montreal from July 19–26. In 2015, no tournament was held. In 2018, the Open was held in Quebec City on July 6–13. In 2019, it was held in Regina, Saskatchewan, the first time ever in that province.

For both 2020 and 2021, the championship was cancelled due to the COVID-19 pandemic. The 2022 championship was held July 12–17 in Hamilton, Ontario.

List of winners and tournament sites 

{| class="sortable wikitable"
! # !! Year !! City !! Winner
|-
|  1 || 1956 || Montreal || Larry Evans, William Lombardy
|-
|  2 || 1958 || Winnipeg || Elod Macskasy
|-
|  3 || 1960 || Kitchener || Anthony Saidy
|-
|  4 || 1962 || Ottawa || Laszlo Witt
|-
|  5 || 1964 || Toronto || Pal Benko
|-
|  6 || 1966 || Kingston || Larry Evans
|-
|  7 || 1968 || Toronto || Bent Larsen
|-
|  8 || 1970 || St. John's || Bent Larsen
|-
|  9 || 1971 || Vancouver || Boris Spassky, Hans Ree
|-
| 10 || 1973 || Ottawa || Duncan Suttles
|-
| 11 || 1974 || Montreal || Ljubomir Ljubojević
|-
| 12 || 1975 || Calgary || Leonid Shamkovich
|-
| 13 || 1976 || Toronto || Nick de Firmian, Lawrence Day
|-
| 14 || 1977 || Fredericton || Jan Green-Krotki
|-
| 15 || 1978 || Hamilton || Gyula Sax
|-
| 16 || 1979 || Edmonton || Daniel Yanofsky
|-
| 17 || 1980 || Ottawa || Lawrence Day
|-
| 18 || 1981 || Beauport || Igor Vasilyevich Ivanov
|-
| 19 || 1982 || Vancouver || Gordon Taylor
|-
| 20 || 1983 || Toronto || Kevin Spraggett, Božidar Ivanović
|-
| 21 || 1984 || Ottawa || Igor Vasilyevich Ivanov, Dave Ross, Brett Campbell, Denis Allan
|-
| 22 || 1985 || Edmonton || Igor Vasilyevich Ivanov, Brian Hartman
|-
| 23 || 1986 || Winnipeg || Artur Yusupov, Viktor Kupreichik
|-
| 24 || 1987 || Toronto || Kevin Spraggett
|-
| 25 || 1988 || Toronto || Lawrence Day
|-
| 26 || 1989 || Edmonton || Vladimir Tukmakov
|-
| 27 || 1990 || Edmundston || Georgi Timoshenko
|-
| 28 || 1991 || Windsor || Walter Browne
|-
| 29 || 1992 || Toronto || Alexei Barsov, Bryon Nickoloff
|-
| 30 || 1993 || London || Kevin Spraggett
|-
| 31 || 1994 || Winnipeg || Vladimir Tukmakov
|-
| 32 || 1995 || Toronto || Kevin Spraggett, Eduardas Rozentalis, Deen Hergott,Bryon Nickoloff, Ron Livshits
|-
| 33 || 1996 || Calgary || Kevin Spraggett
|-
| 34 || 1997 || Winnipeg || Julian Hodgson
|-
| 35 || 1998 || Ottawa || Kevin Spraggett, Dimitri Tyomkin,Michael Oratovsky, Evgeny Prokopchuk
|-
| 36 || 1999 || Vancouver || Kevin Spraggett, Georgi Orlov
|-
| 37 || 2000 || Edmonton || Joel Benjamin, Kevin Spraggett, Jonathan Rowson
|-
| 38 || 2001 || Sackville || Tony Miles, Larry Christiansen
|-
| 39 || 2002 || Montreal || Pascal Charbonneau, Jean Hébert, Jean-Marc Degraeve
|-
| 40 || 2003 || Kapuskasing || Alexander Moiseenko
|-
| 41 || 2004 || Kapuskasing || Alexander Moiseenko, Dimitri Tyomkin
|-
| 42 || 2005 || Edmonton || Vassily Ivanchuk, Alexei Shirov, Viktor Bologan,Mark Bluvshtein, Saptarshi Roy Chowdhury
|-
| 43 || 2006 || Kitchener || Walter Arencibia, Abhijit Kunte
|-
| 44 || 2007 || Ottawa || Bu Xiangzhi
|-
| 45 || 2008 || Montreal || Alexander Moiseenko, Victor Mikhalevski, Eduardas Rozentalis, Matthieu Cornette 
|-
| 46 || 2009 || Edmonton || Mark Bluvshtein, Edward Porper
|-
| 47 || 2010 || Toronto || Luke McShane
|-
| 48 || 2011 || Toronto || Walter Arencibia, Joel Benjamin, Dejan Bojkov
|-
| 49 || 2012 || Victoria || Eric Hansen
|-
| 50 || 2013 || Ottawa || Nigel Short, Eric Hansen 
|-
| 51 || 2014 || Montreal || Sergei Tiviakov (on Armageddon tiebreak, ahead ofRobin van Kampen and Ehsan Ghaem-Maghami) 
|-
| 52 || 2016 || Windsor || Gergely Antal
|-
| 53 || 2017 || Sault Ste. Marie || Razvan Preotu, Aman Hambleton
|-
| 54 || 2018 || Quebec City || Bitan Banerjee (on tiebreak, ahead of Raymond Kaufman)
|-
| 55 || 2019 || Regina || Alexander Cherniaev
|-
| 56 || 2022 || Hamilton || Nikolay Noritsyn, Shawn Rodrigue-Lemieux
|-
|}

See also
Canadian Chess Championship

References

Canadian Chess Champions  compiled by David Cohen
Canadian Open Chess Winners compiled by Jonathan Berry

External links 
  2009 Canadian Open official website
  2013 Canadian Open official website
  2014 Canadian Open official website
 2016 Canadian Open official website

Chess competitions
Chess in Canada
1956 in chess
Recurring sporting events established in 1956